Operation Grand Slam was a key military operation of the Indo-Pakistani War of 1965. It refers to a plan drawn up by the Pakistan Army in May 1965 that consisted of an attack on the vital Akhnoor Bridge in Indian-administered Jammu and Kashmir. The bridge was not only the lifeline of an entire infantry division of the Indian Army, but could also be used to threaten the city of Jammu, an important logistical point for Indian forces. The operation ended in a failure for the Pakistan Army as the stated military objectives were not achieved, and Pakistani forces were subsequently forced to retreat following a counterattack by the Indian Army whereby a new front was opened in the Pakistani province of Punjab.

Planning

The Operation Grand Slam was designed as a twin of the Operation Gibraltar, both of which were meant to jeopardise India's control of Kashmir and bring it to the negotiating table without risking a general war across the international border.
The idea for Grand Slam came from President Ayub Khan. When he reviewed the plans for Gibraltar in May 1965, he pointed to Akhnur on the map and called it a "jugular" for India. By seizing Akhnur, India's overland supply route to Kashmir would be cut off.

Ayub Khan was mistaken. India's supply route to Kashmir did not pass through Akhnur. (The National Highway 1A passed through Udhampur and Ramban, not Akhnur.) General Akhtar Malik, who was in charge of both Gibraltar and Grand Slam, however understood the President's demand for a "jugular". He developed secret plans to proceed to Jammu after taking Akhnur, where he could cut off the highway. These plans were not revealed to the President, who would have apprehended the possibility of a general war.

Also mired in confusion were the conditions under which Grand Slam was to be launched. According to some sources Grand Slam was to be launched only after Gibraltar had succeeded. A failure of Gibraltar should have necessitated a rethink.
According to others, Grand Slam itself was needed in order to "encash" Gibraltar.
Neither Gibraltar nor Grand Slam had the full support of the Army Headquarters.

In addition to these confusions, there was also a technical issue. In order to avoid the possibility of a general war, Pakistan needed to make the operation appear to be a "localised conflict" in Kashmir. This meant launching its attack across the cease-fire line in Kashmir. But the operational plans for Grand Slam required the Pakistani forces to cross a "small section" of the border between Pakistani Punjab and Kashmir, which India regarded as an international border.
In the event, it made no difference to India which border the Pakistani forces crossed.

Indian weaknesses 
Even though Akhnur was not the "jugular" that President Ayub Khan imagined, it was still a key choke point. It had the only bridge across the Chenab River in this area, on which ran the supply route to the western districts of Rajouri and Poonch. The bridge was capable of carrying only light tanks. It had not been strengthened over the years, despite warnings from various local commanders. In addition, the cease-fire line was defended only lightly, as per the UN-mediated cease-fire agreement at the end of the First Kashmir War. It would be quickly overrun in the event of a full scale invasion.

At the time of the opening attack of Operation Grand Slam, the Chhamb Jaurian sector was defended on the Indian side by the 191st (Independent) Infantry Brigade, comprising three battalions, and supported by a squadron of 20 Lancers , which was equipped with AMX-13 light tanks.

Decision to launch 

The Operation Gibraltar went badly. The plan was to infiltrate thousands of troops into Indian-administered Kashmir in the guise of 'mujahideen', who would carry out sabotage to demoralise the Indian forces and incite the local population to revolt. But the local population did not rise, the infiltrators were quickly identified and the Indian Army began to hunt them down. In addition, the Indian Army moved across the cease-fire line to cut off the Pakistani infiltration routes and captured the Haji Pir pass (in Pakistan-administered Poonch) and some heights in the Kargil sector.

On 24 August, General Akhtar Malik started pressing the Army Headquarters for permission to launch the Operation Grand Slam. In his view, unless it was launched, it was only a matter of time before all the Gibraltar forces in Indian-administered Kashmir would be captured or killed, and nothing would have been achieved from the whole operation. The Army referred the issue to the President, but Ayub Khan withheld approval. He went away to Swat to reflect on options. On 28 August, after the fall of the Haji Pir Pass, Malik briefed the Army chief. It was believed that India would take more territory unless something was done. The Army chief approached the foreign minister Zulfikar Ali Bhutto (later prime minister) to obtain the President's approval. Bhutto is cited by the Army officers as having been the main driving force behind the entire military operation, and he was also said to be close enough to Ayub Khan to obtain his approval.

Bhutto returned from Swat the next day with the President's order to

Ayub Khan also ordered the army to be prepared for Indian retaliation. He also warned the army that it would be a long struggle.

General Malik seemingly had his permission for the operation. But perhaps he didn't, because he knew fully well that he was provoking a general war contrary to the President's directive.

Execution
The Pakistani Army commenced Operation Grand Slam at 0500 hours on 1 September 1965.

The Akhnoor sector was lightly defended by four Indian infantry battalions and a squadron of tanks. The infantry was stretched thin along the border and the AMX-13 tanks were no match for the Pakistani M47 Patton and M48 Patton tanks. Against a militarily stronger and larger Pakistani thrust, the Indian forces retreated from their defensive positions. According to Pakistani military historian Major (retd.) A. H. Amin, the Pakistani forces in Operation Grand Slam had a 6 to 1 advantage over Indian AMX-13 tanks, which were like 'matchboxes' in front of the Pakistani Pattons. In terms of artillery, Pakistan's 8 inch guns were superior to anything that Indians had at that time and had an overall superiority of 6 to 1.

On the second day of the attack, the GOC of the 12th Infantry Division Major General Akhtar Hussain Malik, commanding the overall forces in the area, was replaced by Major General Yahya Khan, the GOC of the 7th Infantry Division, which delayed the attack by one day. Not only did this decision cause confusion among the Pakistani officer cadre, the delay also permitted the Indians to rush reinforcements to the sector. When the attack recommenced on 3 September, the Indian forces in the sector were sufficiently reinforced to hold out for a few more days, but they did not have the strength to launch a counterattack. As the attack carried on for two more days without any significant gains in territory, the Indian Army opened up a new front, on 6 September, across the sensitive state of Punjab in Pakistan. The advance of the Indian Army also threatened to cut across the right flank of the Pakistani attack. Realising the gravity of the threat, the Pakistani Army stopped its thrust into Kashmir and diverted forces to counter the Indian incursion.

Notes

References

Bibliography

External links

 Bharat-Rakshak Official Indian Account can be found here.
 Defence Journal A Pakistani Account of 1965.
 Air Commodore Syed Sajjad Haider on 1965 war and surrounding events
 Battle of Chhamb Pakistan Army War Diary of 1965 War.

Indo-Pakistani War of 1965
Grand Slam
September 1965 events in Asia